Büyükçobanlar railway station is a railway station near Çobanlar, Turkey. TCDD Taşımacılık operates a daily inter-city train from İzmir to Konya which stops at the station at night. The station is located between two towns with the same name, Çobanlar.

Büyükçobanlar station was opened in 1977 along with the Afyon Sugar Refinery.

References

External links
TCDD Taşımacılık
Turkish State Railways
Turkish train timetables

Railway stations in Afyonkarahisar Province
Railway stations opened in 1977